, also known as Jin-Roh: The Wolf Brigade in its American release, is a 1999 Japanese action political thriller anime film directed by Hiroyuki Okiura (in his directorial debut) and written by Mamoru Oshii. Jin-Roh is the third film in Oshii's Kerberos saga and is primarily based on Oshii's manga Kerberos Panzer Cop.

The film follows Kazuki Fuse, a member of a special police unit set during an alternate history of 1950s Japanese riots. Failing to follow an order to execute a frightened young girl only to see her commit suicide by detonating an improvised explosive device before his very eyes, Fuse is put on trial and sent back to the training camp for re-evaluation. Visiting the grave of the suicide, he meets Kei, the girl's sister, who does not hold him responsible for her demise. The film proceeds as the two develop a peculiar relationship.

The film premiered on November 17, 1999, in France, and Bandai Entertainment and Viz Media licensed the film for an English-language release in North America and Europe. It has been relicensed in North America by Discotek Media, with a DVD released on April 29, 2014 followed by a Blu-Ray on January 27, 2015.

Plot

The story is set in alternate-history Japan in the 1950s following the atomic bombing and subsequent occupation (by a victorious German Reich, rather than the Allies) of the country at the end of World War II and the post-war recovery. It focuses on Kazuki Fuse, a member of the elite Kerberos Panzer Corps, a metropolitan counter-terrorism unit. Fuse confronts his own humanity when he fails to shoot a young  terrorist that his unit traps in the storm-water tunnels. She detonates a bomb in front of him, but only kills herself. The incident damages the reputation of the unit and Fuse is reprimanded. He visits the ashes of the dead girl and meets Kei Amemiya, who claims to be the elder sister of the terrorist and they develop a friendship. Kei is eventually revealed not to be the suicide bomber's sister, but a former bomb courier coerced into acting on behalf of the Special Unit's rival division Public Security.

A trap is set by the local police forces and the Public Security Division intended to discredit the Special Unit with Kei as bait to catch Fuse, intending to show a terrorist passing a satchel bomb to a member of the Panzers. However, Fuse sneaks in, seizes Kei, neutralizes the Capitol Police agents and they escape. Later, Kei reveals her role in the deception and suggests they leave together, but Fuse decides to stay.

They make their way to the tunnels once more, where they are met by members of the Wolf Brigade, a secret, deep-cover unit in the Kerberos Corps led by Hajime Handa. They provide Fuse with a full set of armor and weaponry, before leaving with Kei in tow. Hachiroh Tohbe explains to Kei that the Wolf Brigade has used the Public Security Division's plan to flush out those who were most active in trying to eliminate the Kerberos Corps, and eliminate them in turn. Public Security agents follow a tracking device in Kei's bag and make their way into the tunnels. They encounter the fully armored Fuse, who slaughters them all.

Later, the Wolf Brigade meet in a junkyard and Fuse is ordered to kill Kei to ensure she is never recaptured by Public Security. Kei embraces Fuse and sadly recites the dialogue of Little Red Riding Hood, describing the grotesque appearance of the wolf disguised as a loved one. Fuse is distraught, but regardless kills Kei. Fuse is horrified at his action, but now having sacrificed his humanity, he has no other choice but to remain part of the pack. The old sergeant solemnly compares Kei's fate to the demise of Red Riding Hood and the triumph of the wolf.

Cast
 Yoshikatsu Fujiki (Michael Dobson in the English version) as 
 Sumi Mutoh (Moneca Stori in the English version) as 
 Hiroyuki Kinoshita (Colin Murdock in the English version) as 
 Eri Sendai (Maggie Blue O'Hara in the English version) as 
 Kenji Nakagawa (French Tickner in the English version) as 
 Kousei Hirota (Dale Wilson in the English version) as 
 Ryuichi Horibe (Ron Halder in the English version) as 
 Yukihiro Yoshida (Michael Kopsa in the English version) as 
 Tamio Ōki as 
 Yoshisada Sakaguchi (Doug Abrahams in the English version) as

Production
Mamoru Oshii had wanted to do what ultimately became Jin-Roh several years prior. It was originally planned to be the third and final live-action feature film of the Kerberos trilogy, but its production wasn't possible until 1994, while Oshii was already working on Ghost in the Shell. As the filmmaker wasn't able to produce two films in the same time but didn't want someone else to direct his final episode, Oshii decided that the third episode would be an anime instead.

The project was originally pitched as a six-episode OVA as he knew Bandai Visual was interested in having him do a series for them and his original Kerberos Panzer Cop manga was formed by six chapters. As he proposed the project to Bandai Visual at a meeting they instead asked him to direct Ghost in the Shell but green-lit the series for pre-production. The production eventually evolved into a feature film following the international success of Ghost in the Shell as Manga Entertainment wanted a similar hit and saw potential in Kerberos Panzer Cops as the manga had been published in the United States.

After reluctantly giving up the directorial role, Oshii originally thought on Patlabor 2: The Movie animation director Kazuchika Kise, but he had no interest in chief direction at the time. He then committed Jin-Roh as a debut film to a trusted young collaborator, Hiroyuki Okiura, who had worked on animation movies such as Ghost in the Shell (character designer) and Patlabor 2: The Movie. Oshii considered him the most able candidate among the younger staff of the studio and both Production IG and Bandai Visual, knowing about his directing ambitions and his interest in creating a serious drama, wanted him to do his debut for them.

Oshii "begged" to at least be entrusted with the screenplay, the prospect of working with Okiura changing his previous reluctance about merely writing films. This wasn't originally in Bandai's plans for the film, but Oshii expected Kazunori Itō, his usual screenwriter, to reject their offer as he had previously told him that he didn't want to write a story involving dogs following his work for Jin-Roh live-action prequel The Red Spectacles, and after he did so he was offered the role. He ultimately still found the experience frustrating both through the tiping ("The moment you write, you want to direct") and after realizing the result would unavoidably be much different from what he pictured in his head. Lacking any creative control on the process, he chose to distance himself from the animation production while looking forward to the final product.

Okiura favored traditional animation, and thus the film was almost completely drawn by hand, requiring 80,000 cels. Oshii, who characterized him as "allergic to computers", admitted that had he directed the film he would have relied in computer animation just as he did in Ghost in the Shell and no more than 30,000 cels would have been needed. Still the celwork was subsequently processed through the Animo software in order to enhance some visual effects, textures and camerawork.

The film's musical score was composed by Hajime Mizoguchi.

Release
Jin-Roh was first seen in the early 1999 film festival circuit, including the 49th Berlinale and the 19th Fantasporto in February. It was subsequently shown in Cannes' Marché du Film, which presumably netted its early French theatrical release on November 17. The Japanese preview of the film took place on June 19 in the Roppongi 20th Century Films theater.

Media

Printed media
 2000.06: Jin-Roh Behind Of The Screen (official making book)
Japanese text, Mamoru Oshii, Production I.G, 
 2000.09: Jin-Roh Maniaxx (mook -magazine/book-)
Japanese text, Mamoru Oshii, Kadokawa Shoten, 
 2000.12: Jin-Roh Screenboard Book (official storyboard)
Japanese text, 522p., Hiroyuki Okiura, Production I.G
available in the L.E. DVD set only

Soundtrack
 2000.06: Jin-Roh Original Motion Picture Soundtrack (CD)
Hajime Mizoguchi feat. Gabriela Robin, Members of Czech Philharmonic Orchestra, Victor Ent. VICL-60569
   2002.03: Jin-Roh: The Wolf Brigade Sound Track (CD)
Bandai Ent.
available in the L.E. DVD set only

Reception
An early comment on the film was given by Blue Sky animator André Mazzone, who was shown the film in May 1999 as part of a delegation from the studio to Production IG's headquarters. He praised it for the beauty of its animation and character designs and the "subtle and crafty twists" in the story, and commented that the differing approaches to production meant directors were freed from needing to appeal to a wide target audience and allowed have a much greater creative control than in Hollywood animated features, favoring the sophisticated productions anime was known for.

The following month the film shown in Cannes' Marché du Film, where Variety's Derek Elley noted it for pushing cel animation to its limits in the action scenes and for Okiura's focus on stillness in between while considering it a less complex work than its predecessor Ghost in the Shell lacking its "stomach-churning, visionary moments".

Hyper commends the film for its "art direction and character design which are beautiful examples of hand-drawn animation and the music fits the action (or lack thereof) brilliantly. However, the film's "slow, deliberate pace" is criticised. Helen McCarthy in 500 Essential Anime Movies called the anime "a must-see" and praised the score and the design, commenting on "some breathtakingly composed scenes".

Remake
A South Korean live-action remake titled Illang: The Wolf Brigade directed by Kim Jee-woon updates the setting from Japan to a dystopian South Korea, where the plot revolves around plans to unite the two Koreas. The film stars Gang Dong-won, Han Hyo-joo, and Jung Woo-sung, and was released on July 15, 2018.

Awards

References

Bibliography
 
 Gustav Horn, Carl (2002). "Frontiers of Total Filmmaking: Mamoru Oshii Creator of Jin-Roh." Pamphlet from DVD. Jin-Roh: the Wolf Brigade Special Edition.

External links

 Jin-Roh: The Wolf Brigade at Production I.G
 
 
 

1999 anime films
Action anime and manga
Bandai Entertainment anime titles
Discotek Media
Films about terrorism in Asia
Films directed by Hiroyuki Okiura
Films set in the 1950s
Films set in Tokyo
Japanese alternate history films
Japanese political films
1990s Japanese-language films
Kerberos saga
Production I.G
Political action films
Political thriller anime and manga
Viz Media anime
Japanese adult animated films